National Institute of Technology (NIT) is a private polytechnic institute in Muradpur, Chittagong, Bangladesh. It offers a four-year diploma in engineering under BTEB. It was established 1999.

In 2003, it was granted autonomy and became the National Institute of Technology Chittagong, under the Ministry of Education, Government of Bangladesh.

NIT Chittagong offers undergraduate and graduate programs in various engineering disciplines, and also offers postgraduate programs in engineering, management, and computer applications.

Grading system
The academic year consists of eight semesters.

Campus
Muradpur, Chittagong, Bangladesh.

Departments
Four-year diploma engineering courses under BTEB:
Diploma in Electrical
Diploma in Electronics
Diploma in Computer
Diploma in Civil
Diploma in Mechanical
Diploma in Architecture
Diploma in Garments & Fashion Design
Diploma in Textile
Diploma in Marine
Diploma in Automobile

References 

Universities and colleges in Chittagong